Niall Claffey (born 1978 in Birr, County Offaly) is an Irish sportsperson.  He plays hurling with his local club Birr and was a member of the Offaly senior inter-county team between 1999 and 2006.

References 

1978 births
Living people
Birr hurlers
Offaly inter-county hurlers